Coleophora yunnanica is a moth of the family Coleophoridae. It is found in Yunnan, China.

The wingspan is 12–13 mm.

References

yunnanica
Moths of Asia
Moths described in 1989